Toto may refer to:

Arts and entertainment

Fictional characters
 Toto (Oz), a dog in the novel and film The Wonderful Wizard of Oz
 Toto, in Japanese The Cat Returns
 a character in Le château à Toto (Toto’s castle), 1868 opéra bouffe
 the title character of Princess Toto, 1876 comic opera by W. S. Gilbert and Frederic Clay
 the title character of Toto of Arabia, 1965 Italian-Spanish adventure-comedy film
 Toto, the main character of Toto Forever, 2010 short film
 Toto, a Gamera character from Gamera the Brave
 Toto, the main character in Stories Toto Told Me and In His Own Image by Frederick Rolfe

Other uses in arts and entertainment 

 Toto (1933 film), a 1933 French film directed by Jacques Tourneur
 Toto (band)
 Toto (album), their debut album
 Toto!: The Wonderful Adventure, Japanese manga series
 "Toto" (Drax Project song), a 2018 song
 "Toto" (Noizy song), a 2018 song featuring RAF Camora

Gaming and gambling
 Football pools, called "toto" in several languages
 Toto (lottery), a lottery in Singapore
 TotoGaming, an Armenian gaming operator
 Sports Toto, a Malaysian gambling company

People 
 Toto people, ethnonym for isolated tribal group from Totopara, Alipurduar district, West Bengal, India
 Toto language, spoken by the Toto people

Performing names
 Totò, stage name of Antonio De Curtis (1898–1967), Italian comedian, actor, writer, and songwriter
 Totó la Momposina, Colombian singer Sonia Bazanta Vides (born 1948)

Other personal names
 Toto (surname)
 Toto (given name)
 Toto (nickname)

Places 
 Toto, Nigeria, Local Government Area of Nasarawa State
 Toto, Indiana, U.S., an unincorporated community
 To-To, California, U.S., former Native American settlement at (and nickname for) Totoma, California
 Toto, Gumla, census town in Jharkhand, India

Sports 
 Toto African, a football club in Mwanza, Tanzania
 Toto Cup, an association football tournament in Israel
 Toto Japan Classic, an annual women's professional golf tournament

Other uses 
 Toto (gorilla) (1931–1968), a female adopted by A. Maria Hoyt
 Toto, a cheetah cub seen in the BBC series Big Cat Diary
 Toto (dessert), a small coconut cake in Jamaican cuisine
 Toto Ltd., a Japanese toilet manufacturer 
 Toto (mythology), a chief in Māori mythology

See also 
 
 
 TOTO (disambiguation)
 Tōto (disambiguation)
 In toto
 Toto and Cleopatra, a 1963 Italian adventure-comedy film 

Language and nationality disambiguation pages